Crenobia is a genus of planarians in the family Planariidae. It is endemic to Europe and Anatolia.

Description 
The genus Crenobia includes planarians with an extremely thick muscle coat surrounding the genital atrium. The copulatory bursa it relatively small when compared to other genera of freshwater planarians.

Distribution 
The genus Crenobia occurs in Anatolia and across most of Europe, including several islands in the Mediterranean Sea, although it seems to be absent in most of the Iberian Peninsula.

Species
The following species are currently recognized in the genus Crenobia:
 

Crenobia alpina 
Crenobia anophthalma 
Crenobia bathycola 
Crenobia corsica 
Crenobia montenigrina

References 

Continenticola
Rhabditophora genera